Dawid Andrzej Konarski (born 31 August 1989) is a Polish professional volleyball player. He was a member of the Poland national team from 2012 to 2021. A participant in the Olympic Games Rio 2016, and a two–time World Champion (2014, 2018). At the professional club level, he plays for Aluron CMC Warta Zawiercie.

Personal life
Konarski was born in Świecie, Poland. On 30 June 2012, he married Sabina Rożek.

Career

Clubs
In April 2015, Konarski moved to ZAKSA Kędzierzyn-Koźle.

National team
On 11 May 2012, Konarski debuted in the senior national team in a friendly match with Australia at Atlas Arena in Łódź. He played in the intercontinental round of the 2014 World League. On 16 August 2014, he was appointed to the national team for the 2014 World Championship held in Poland. On 21 September 2014, he won a title of the World Champion. On 27 October 2014, he received a state award granted by the Polish President Bronisław Komorowski – Gold Cross of Merit for outstanding sports achievements and worldwide promotion of Poland.

On 30 September 2018, Poland achieved its third title of the World Champions. Poland beat Brazil in the final 3–0 and defended the title from 2014.

Honours

Clubs
 CEV Champions League
  2014/2015 – with Asseco Resovia
 CEV Cup
  2017/2018 – with Ziraat Bankası Ankara
 National championships
 2013/2014  Polish SuperCup, with Asseco Resovia
 2014/2015  Polish Championship, with Asseco Resovia
 2015/2016  Polish Championship, with ZAKSA Kędzierzyn-Koźle
 2016/2017  Polish Cup, with ZAKSA Kędzierzyn-Koźle
 2016/2017  Polish Championship, with ZAKSA Kędzierzyn-Koźle

Individual awards
 2013: Polish SuperCup – Most Valuable Player
 2017: Polish Cup – Best Opposite
 2017: Polish Cup – Most Valuable Player
 2019: Polish Cup – Best Server

State awards
 2014:  Gold Cross of Merit
 2018:  Knight's Cross of Polonia Restituta

References

External links

 
 Player profile at PlusLiga.pl 
 Player profile at Volleybox.net
 
 

1989 births
Living people
People from Świecie
Sportspeople from Kuyavian-Pomeranian Voivodeship
Polish men's volleyball players
Olympic volleyball players of Poland
Volleyball players at the 2016 Summer Olympics
European Games competitors for Poland
Volleyball players at the 2015 European Games
Recipients of the Gold Cross of Merit (Poland)
Polish expatriate sportspeople in Turkey
Expatriate volleyball players in Turkey
BKS Visła Bydgoszcz players
Resovia (volleyball) players
ZAKSA Kędzierzyn-Koźle players
Jastrzębski Węgiel players
Czarni Radom players
Warta Zawiercie players
Opposite hitters